Bassi Wildlife Sanctuary is a wildlife sanctuary near Bassi in Chittorgarh district of Rajasthan, India, 5 kilometres from the Bassi Fort Palace. It covers an area of 15,290 hectares and was established in 1988. The sanctuary is located on the western border of the Vindhyachal Ranges and includes the Orai and Bassi dam are part of the sanctuary. Antelope, wild boar, panther, mongoose and migratory birds inhabit the sanctuary.

Animals found at the Bassi Wildlife Sanctuary:

 Jackal
 Crocodile
 Crane
 Wild cat
 Civet
 Chinkara
 Panther
 Spotted deer (Chital)
 Peacock
 Porcupine
 Hyena
 Langoor
 Fox
 Blue bull
 Wild Boar
 Eagle
 Hare
 Ghoda wild horse
Bassi Wildlife Sanctuary is also attractive to many migratory birds that can be found here throughout the year.

The forest is mostly dry and deciduous, the trees that are most represented are Dhok, Churel, Butea, and there is a large amount of medicinal herbs and flowers.

See also 
 Arid Forest Research Institute (AFRI)
 Bassi Dam

References

Bassi Wildlife Sanctuary
India9.com
World Database on Protected Areas

Wildlife sanctuaries in Rajasthan
Protected areas established in 1988
Tourist attractions in Chittorgarh district
1988 establishments in Rajasthan